Imbibe! is a book by cocktail historian David Wondrich. It was first published in November 2007 by Perigee Books.

Synopsis 
The book is intended as a follow up to Jerry Thomas' 1862 book How to Mix Drinks, or The Bon Vivant's Companion. The life of Thomas, as well as various celebrity bartenders who preceded him, is also explored in the book. The book describes the history of American bar culture, as well as the development of the mixed drink. Included are numerous recipes for cocktails from Thomas' book, and their historical origins as well as more modern additions.

Reception 
The book received generally positive reviews, and became extremely popular after its publication. It was featured in publications such as The Washington Post, GrubStreet, Wine & Spirits, New York, and Wine Enthusiast.

A revised edition featuring additional recipes expanded historical backgrounds was published by Perigee and Penguin Random House in 2015.

References 

American history books
American cookbooks
History books about the United States
Works about beer
Books about wine
2007 non-fiction books
TarcherPerigee books